

Events 
Pierre-Francisque Caroubel relocated to Paris.
Carolus Luython becomes court organist and composer to Rudolf II, Holy Roman Emperor, at Vienna.

Publications 
Giammateo Asola
 for six voices (Venice: Girolamo Scotto), also includes two Magnificats
 (Mass for the dead) for four voices (Venice: Angelo Gardano)
Lodovico Balbi – Second book of madrigals for four voices (Venice: Angelo Gardano)
Antoine de Bertrand –  put to music for three voices (Paris: Le Roy & Ballard), a chanson cycle setting texts from Pierre de Ronsard's 
Fabrice Caietain – Airs for four voices (Paris: Le Roy & Ballard), contains settings of poems by Ronsard and other contemporary poets
Thomas Crecquillon – Motets for four, five, six and eight voices (Leuven: Pierre Phalèse), published posthumously
Estevan Daça –  (Valladolid: Diego Fernando de Cordova), a collection of pieces for the vihuela
Andrea Gabrieli –  for four voices (Venice: Angelo Gardano)
Marc'Antonio Ingegneri – First book of motets for five voices (Venice: Angelo Gardano)
Orlande de Lassus
, Part 5 (Munich: Adam Berg), a collection of Magnificats for four, five, six, and eight voices
Luzzasco Luzzaschi – Second book of madrigals for five voices (Venice: Angelo Gardano)
Giovanni de Macque – First book of madrigals for six voices (Venice: Angelo Gardano)
Tiburtio Massaino
Psalms for four voices (Venice: Angelo Gardano)
First book of motets for five and six voices (Venice: Giuseffo Guglielmo)
Philippe de Monte – Third book of madrigals for six voices (Venice: Angelo Gardano)
Leonhard Päminger –  (Third book of ecclesiastical songs), published posthumously in Nuremberg
Bonifacio Pasquale –  (Venice: Girolamo Scotto)

Classical music 
Luzzasco Luzzaschi – Quivi sospiri

Births 
October – Thomas Weelkes, organist and composer (died 1623)

Deaths 
January 19 – Hans Sachs, meistersinger (born 1494)
August – Bálint Bakfark, Hungarian and Polish composer and lutenist (born 1507)
probable
David Abell, organist and composer
Josquin Baston, court composer
Jan van Wintelroy, Franco-Flemish composer and choirmaster

 
Music
16th century in music
Music by year